Dolichopus occidentalis is a species of long-legged fly in the family Dolichopodidae.

References

occidentalis
Articles created by Qbugbot
Insects described in 1893
Taxa named by John Merton Aldrich